The 1995 Texas Tech Red Raiders football team represented Texas Tech University as a member of the Southwest Conference (SWC) during the 1995 NCAA Division I-A football season. Led by 
ninth-year head coach Spike Dykes, the Red Raiders compiled an overall record of 9–3 with a mark of 5–2 in conference play, placing in a three-way tie for second in the SWC. Texas Tech was invited to the Copper Bowl, where they defeated Air Force. The Red Raiders offense scored 385 points while the defense allowed 247 points om the season. The Southwest Conference dissolved in 1996, and Texas Tech joined the newly-formed Big 12 Conference.

Schedule

Team players drafted into the NFL

References

Texas Tech
Texas Tech Red Raiders football seasons
Guaranteed Rate Bowl champion seasons
Texas Tech Red Raiders football